Nicasio Elementary School District is a public school district in Marin County, California, United States. The school was founded in 1862.

Gallery

References

External links
 

School districts in Marin County, California